Škrajnek (in older sources also Skranjek) is a small settlement north of Velike Poljane in the Municipality of Ribnica in southern Slovenia. The entire municipality is part of the traditional region of Lower Carniola and is now included in the Southeast Slovenia Statistical Region.

Mass grave
Škrajnek is the site of a mass grave associated with the Second World War. The Škrajnek Shaft Mass Grave is located southwest of the village, along the road to Velike Poljane. It is believed to contain the remains of unidentified victims.

Cultural heritage
There is a small chapel-shrine in the settlement. It dates to the mid-19th century.

References

External links
Škrajnek on Geopedia

Populated places in the Municipality of Ribnica